Val-de-Saâne (literally Vale of Saâne) is a commune in the Seine-Maritime department in the Normandy region in north-western France.

Geography
The commune was created in 1964 by the fusion of the four villages of Anglesqueville-sur-Saâne, Eurville, Thiédeville and Varvannes.

Heraldry

Population

Places of interest
 The church of St. Wandrille, dating from the eleventh century.
 The church of St. Sulpice, dating from the nineteenth century.
 The church of St. Nicaise, dating from the eleventh century.
 The church of St. Pierre at Eurville.
 The sixteenth-century château of Varvannes.

See also
Communes of the Seine-Maritime department

References

Communes of Seine-Maritime